Francis Morgan Rotch (February 20, 1822 in New Bedford, Bristol County, Massachusetts – November 28, 1863 in Morris, Otsego County, New York) was an American politician from New York.

Life
He was the son of Francis Rotch (1788–1874) and Ann Wain (Morgan) Rotch (1800–1884). In 1831, the family removed to Morris. He graduated from Harvard College in 1841. From 1843 to 1846, he traveled around Europe. Afterwards, he engaged in agricultural pursuits. He was a member of the New York State Senate (20th D.) in 1860 and 1861.

On February 12, 1862, he was appointed by Gov. Edwin D. Morgan as one of his aides-de-camp with the rank of colonel. On May 6, 1862, Rotch married Catherine W. Gilbert, and their only child was Francis Rotch (1863–1918). While on official business with the New York regiments of the Army of the Potomac, he contracted a fever in the swamps near Yorktown, Virginia. After lingering on for a few months, he died suddenly at his home and was buried at the Hillington Cemetery in Morris.

His great-granduncle Francis Rotch owned the vessel Dartmouth one of three from which the tea was thrown overboard during the Boston Tea Party in 1773.

Sources
 The New York Civil List compiled by Franklin Benjamin Hough, Stephen C. Hutchins and Edgar Albert Werner (1867; pg. 442)
 Biographical Sketches of the State Officers and Members of the Legislature of the State of New York by William D. Murphy (1861; pg. 111ff)
 The Rotches by John Morgan Bullard
 Death of Col. Francis M. Rotch in  NYT on December 5, 1863

External links

1822 births
1863 deaths
Republican Party New York (state) state senators
People from Morris, New York
Harvard College alumni
Politicians from New Bedford, Massachusetts
19th-century American politicians
United States politicians killed during the Civil War